This is a list of kebab dishes from around the world. Kebabs are various cooked meat dishes, with their origins in Middle Eastern cuisine and the Muslim world. Although kebabs are often cooked on a skewer, many types of kebab are not.

Afghanistan

Azerbaijan

China

Cyprus

Ghana

Greece

India

Iran

Not every dish containing the word "kebab" is listed below. For example,  is not listed, because it is a meal consisting of cooked rice and one of the many kebab types listed below.

Levant

Nigeria

Pakistan

Portugal

Romania

South Africa

Spain

Turkey

Others

See also
 List of meat dishes
 List of spit-roasted foods

Notes

References

External links

 50 Kebabs. ''Food Network Magazine.

Middle Eastern grilled meats
+Kebab
World cuisine
Kebab